Krautwiller is a commune in the Bas-Rhin department in Grand Est in north-eastern France.

Geography
Krautwiller is positioned close to Brumath.

History
In a transaction document dating from 742, the settlement is named as "Chrodoltesvillare".

In the medieval period, until 1504, the parish was administratively dependent on Wingersheim.

Landmarks
The chapel has a nave dating back to the eleventh century. A Romanesque doorway (today walled up) was originally the entrance to this ancient chapel dedicated to Saint Ulrich.

See also
 Communes of the Bas-Rhin department

References

Communes of Bas-Rhin
Bas-Rhin communes articles needing translation from French Wikipedia